Bozsik Aréna is a multi-purpose stadium in Budapest, Hungary. The stadium opened on 24 July 2021 and it was renamed after the Budapest Honvéd FC and Hungary footballer József Bozsik (1925–1978). It is used for football matches and it is the home stadium of Nemzeti Bajnokság I club Budapest Honvéd FC.

History

Planning
On 20 November 2014, it was revealed that the reconstruction of Bozsik Aréna was going to start in 2015 and would be finished in 2016. The stadium is the property of the Hungarian state, namely the National Sportcentre. The capacity of the new stadium is 9,000 and there will be 900 VIP seats, 350 skyboxes, and 100 square metre mixed zone for the press.

Óbuda Group was commissioned to plan the new stadium. The planning started in 2014 and finished in the summer of 2015.

On 11 October 2018, it was announced that the construction could begin in 2019.

On 21 February 2019, the demolition was officially started.

Construction
On 21 March 2019, the construction of the new stadium officially began. At the ceremony Tünde Szabó, minister of sport, and George Hemingway, the owner of Budapest Honvéd, were also present. Tünde Szabó said the stadium would be important both for Budapest and Kispest. Tünde Szabó also sai that it was an incredibly important moment in the history of Hungarian football since both Ferenc Puskás and József Bozsik started their career on this ground. George Hemingway emphasised that the stadium would be opened on 12 June 2020. He also said that every type of official UEFA match could be organised in the new stadiums except for Champions League final match. The new stadium will be able to host 8,200 spectators and the main stand will have three floors. The modern floodlight systems will allow to broadcast matches in HD quality. The constructor companies will be Pharos 95 Sportpályaépítő Kft. and West Hungária Bau Kft. Hemingway also said that the former company also constructed the training centre of the club. At the ceremony 250 people were present including Péter Gajda, the mayor of Kispest.

On 17 July 2019, new pictures in connection with the construction were published by Nemzeti Sport.

On 17 October 2019, the stands formed a U-shape.

On 6 December 2019, the highest point of the future stadium was reached.

On 4 January 2021, a new video about the stadium was published on Nemzeti Sport. However, it was not announced when the team can play their first match in the new stadium. According to the plans, on 24 March 2021, Hungary national under-21 football team will host Germany national under-21 football team in the stadium. The video was shot by the WHB Group.

Opening
It was announced that the first match will be played between the second team of Budapest Honvéd and Szekszárdi UFC in the 2020-21 Nemzeti Bajnokság III season. Due to the COVID-19 pandemic, the match will be played without spectators.

On 24 July 2021, Honvéd drew with Villarreal CF at the inauguration match. The ball of the match was delivered by a parachute jumper, while the first kick was performed by the grandson of Ferenc Puskás. Due to COVID-19 infections only the Villarreal CF B could arrive to Budapest.

Recent
The stadium was selected to host the 2021 UEFA European Under-21 Championship.

On 31 July 2021, the first Nemzeti Bajnokság I match was played at the stadium. Budapest Honvéd hosted Debreceni VSC on the first match day of the 2021–22 Nemzeti Bajnokság I season. The home team lost to 1-4. Although Bőle took the lead in the 36th minute, Dzsudzsák, Bárány, Bévárdi and Ugrai scored in the second half.

Costs
According to Szilvia Zsilák's article published on Átlátszó, the initial costs were estimated as 5 billion Hungarian Forints. However, during the construction the costs increased up to 11,7 billion Hungarian Forints.

On 22 April 2020, it was announced that the construction of the stadium would get another 1 billion HUF.

On 6 July 2020, it was revealed that the construction would get another 6 billion HUF aid.

Statues
Gábor Szőke's statue, a lion, was placed in front of the stadium. Szőke's previous works include the eagle of Ferencvárosi TC and the falcon of Atlanta Falcons.

Milestone matches

Attendances
As of 7 May 2020.

See also
List of football stadiums in Hungary

References

External links
Hidegkuti Nándor Stadium at magyarfutball.hu

Football venues in Hungary
Budapest Honvéd FC
Multi-purpose stadiums in Hungary
Sports venues in Budapest